is the northernmost of the national highways of Japan. It connects the cities of Abashiri and Wakkanai in the northern part of the island and prefecture of Hokkaido in northern Japan.

History
On 18 May 1953 the highway was established as Second Class National Highway 238 by the Cabinet of Japan. It was re-designated as General National Route 238 on 1 April 1965.

Major junctions
The route lies entirely within Hokkaido.

See also

References

External links

National highways in Japan
Roads in Hokkaido